This is a list of years in Vietnam.

Before 20th century

20th century

21st century

See also
Timeline of Vietnam under Chinese rule
Timeline of early independent Vietnam
Timeline of the Lý dynasty

 
Vietnam history-related lists
Vietnam